Emma Willmann is an American stand-up comedian and actress. She made her televised stand up debut on The Late Show with Stephen Colbert. Willmann had a recurring role as "Beth" on The CW series Crazy Ex-Girlfriend.

Early life 
Emma Willmann was born in Blue Hill, Maine, where she went to grade school and high school. She is a graduate of George Stevens Academy and currently resides in New York City. Willmann also graduated from Simmons College Boston and received a Masters from The New School New York City.
Willmann is openly lesbian.

Stand-up comedy 
Willmann was featured as a New Face at the Just for Laughs Festival in Montreal in 2016. Time Out New York has recognized her as one of the 10 funniest women in NYC. She performed stand-up on the Seeso series, Night Train with Wyatt Cenac.

Willmann appears on Netflix's The Comedy Lineup, where she performs a 15-minute stand-up set.

Acting 
In 2018, Willmann joined the cast of The CW series Crazy Ex-Girlfriend. She played Beth, Valencia's girlfriend and business partner. She also plays a version of herself on HBO's Crashing.

Radio and podcasting 
Willmann hosts The Check Spot on Sirius XM's Raw Dog Comedy, and co-hosts the podcast Inside the Closet with Matteo Lane and Secret Keepers Club with Carly Aquilino.

References

External links 
 Official website
 

American comedy writers
American stand-up comedians
Living people
Comedians from New York City
21st-century American actresses
American women comedians
21st-century American comedians
People from Blue Hill, Maine
1985 births
Comedians from Maine
LGBT people from Maine
LGBT people from New York (state)
American lesbian actresses
Lesbian comedians
American LGBT comedians